Modern Apizza is an American pizza restaurant in New Haven, Connecticut.  Along with Frank Pepe Pizzeria Napoletana and Sally's Apizza, Modern forms what is informally referred to by locals as the "Holy Trinity" of New Haven-style pizza; the three pizza parlors are consistently ranked by food critics as some of the best pizza places in the world.

History
Originally called State Street Apizza, Modern Apizza was founded in 1934 and has been in the same location ever since. Unlike Frank Pepe Pizzeria Napoletana and Sally's Apizza, the other well-known New Haven pizzerias, Modern Apizza is not located on New Haven's famous Wooster Street but rather on nearby State Street in the East Rock neighborhood. In 2011, the restaurant was visited by Adam Richman on the first episode of the Travel Channel show Man v. Food Nation.

Specialties
Like the Wooster Street pizzerias, Modern serves New Haven-style thin-crust apizza (closely related to Neapolitan-style Italian pizza). Unlike the Wooster Street pizzerias which use coal-fired brick ovens, Modern uses an oil-fueled brick oven. The restaurant also sells Foxon Park soft drinks, made in East Haven, Connecticut, which many locals argue are the perfect beverages to accompany New Haven-style pizza. Modern's specialties include the Clams Casino (Clams, Bacon & Peppers) the Italian Bomb (Sausage, Bacon, Pepperoni, Mushroom, Onion, Pepper & Garlic) and a classic Italian variation: Pizza Margherita, made with fresh mozzarella from Liuzzi Cheese in North Haven, Connecticut. Modern Apizza also uses fresh littleneck clams for their white clam pies; the only difference between Modern and Pepe's is that Modern uses pre-shucked clams while Pepe's shuck their clams on location. Yet another coastal favorite is a white tuna pie.

Awards and accolades
 In a blind taste test conducted by two Yale University undergraduates in 2008, Modern Apizza finished in first place ahead of five other New Haven pizzerias. It has also won the New Haven Advocate’s Best of Reader’s Poll for “Best Pizza” twelve years in a row. Playboy magazine named Modern Apizza as one of the ten best in the country.  In 2017, The Daily Meal ranked Modern as one of the ten best pizza restaurants in the country, from a sampling of over 1,000 pizza restaurants by food critics and pizza experts.

Documentary 
Modern is one of three pizza restaurants featured in the documentary film Pizza A Love Story, directed by Gorman Bechard. The love story to New Haven's holy trinity of pizza restaurants, Pepe's, Sally's, and Modern, had its world premiere at IFFBoston in April 2019. The film was released on DVD and pay-per-view on September 29, 2020. In reviewing the film, Deborah Brown of The Swellesley Report called it “An important film of staggering genius that needed to be made.”

References

Further reading
 Article from Gourmet Magazine
 Article from New England Travel & Life Magazine

External links

 Official website
 Modern's review at New Haven Advocate.com
 Modern's review at Metromix
 Modern's review at Roadfood.com
 Location on Google Maps

Italian-American culture in Connecticut
Pizzerias in the United States
Restaurants in Connecticut
Tourist attractions in New Haven, Connecticut
Economy of New Haven, Connecticut
Buildings and structures in New Haven, Connecticut
Restaurants established in 1934
1934 establishments in Connecticut
Italian restaurants in the United States